Gustavus Hesselius ( – May 25, 1755) was a Swedish-born American painter. He was European trained and became a leading artist in the mid-Atlantic colonies during the first half of the eighteenth century. He was among the earliest portrait painters and organ builders in the United States.  He was named to the Prince George's County Hall of Fame by the Prince George's County Historical Society.

Biography
Hesselius was born in Folkärna parish at Avesta in Dalarna County, Sweden. He was the son of Andreas Olai Hesselius (1644-1700)   and his wife Maria Bergia	(c. 1658-1717). His father was the vicar at Folkärna Church. His mother was the sister-in-law of Jesper Swedberg (1653–1735), Bishop of the Diocese of Skara and aunt of religious leader Emanuel Swedenborg. 

Hesselius had studied art in Sweden and probably in England. He came to Wilmington, Delaware in 1711 together with his elder brother Andreas Hesselius (1677-1733). His brother had been appointed to become parish priest of Holy Trinity Church, the Swedish Lutheran parish at Fort Christina.

He lived in Delaware until 1717, then moved to Philadelphia where he lived until 1721. In 1721, he moved to Prince George's County, Maryland and became a portrait painter.  That same year, he received the first recorded public art commission in the American colonies; he painted The Last Supper. He also painted a Crucifixion.  Some time around 1735, Hesselius returned to Philadelphia where he spent the rest of his life. 

He also worked as an organ builder, having built an organ for the Moravian Church in Bethlehem, Pennsylvania in 1746. From about this time on, he focused on building organs with the assistance of John Clemm (1690–1762). He referred painting commissions to his son John.

Personal life
Gustavus Hesselius was married to Lydia Getchie (1684-1755).  He was the father of painter John Hesselius (1728–1778). His granddaughter Elizabeth Henderson was married to artist Adolf Ulrik Wertmüller (1751-1811). Hesselius  was listed as a member of the Gloria Dei (Old Swedes') Church in Philadelphia. He died during 1755 in Philadelphia, Pennsylvania and was buried on the 25th at Gloria Dei Church.

Style
While most of his portraits adhere to the formality typical for American portrait painting of his time, according to Michael J. Lewis, his portrait of Lappawinsoe, chief of the Lenape, was among the first to foreshadow "the sympathetic and unaffected realism" that would later develop in American portraiture.  The painter was able to ignore the rigid conventions of colonial society because Lappawinsoe was a member of a First Nation.

The Last Supper
The Last Supper by Gustavus Hesselius was the first recorded public art commission in the American colonies. Commissioned in October 1721, it is displayed on the choir gallery of St. Barnabas Church, Upper Marlboro, Maryland. Before this, most painting in the new world had been portraits. The Last Supper was the first significant American painting to depict a scene.

The painting which measures 35 inches by 117½ inches was commissioned for an older church built in 1710, and remained there until the present structure was built in 1774. It disappeared during the construction of the new Brick Church and did not surface again until it was discovered in a private collection in 1848 or 1914, when Charles Henry Hart identified it, depending on which source one follows.

It was on loan by Rose Neel Warrington for a period at the Philadelphia Museum of Art and at the American Swedish Historical Museum as well as the Exhibition of Early American Paintings at the Brooklyn Institute of Arts and Sciences in 1917 and the Wilmington Society of the Fine Arts. The painting was willed once again to St. Barnabas upon Warrington's death.

Gallery

Other significant works
Lapowinsa, by Gustavus Hessulius, c. 1735.  Oil on canvas, 33 × 25 in (83.8 × 63.5 cm). Philadelphia Museum of Art, Philadelphia.
Tishcohan, by Gustavus Hessulius, c. 1735.  Oil on canvas, 33 × 25 in (83.8 × 63.5 cm). Philadelphia Museum of Art, Philadelphia.
Thomas Bordley, by Gustavus Hesselius, c. 1715. Oil on canvas. 27 × 22 41/64 in.(68.6 × 57.5 cm). Maryland Historical Society Accession: 1891-2-1
Mrs. Charles Carroll, the "Settler"''', by Gustavus Hesselius, c. 1717–1720. Oil on canvas. 30 7/64 × 25 13/64 in. (76.5 × 64.0 cm). Maryland Historical Society Accession: 1949-64-1Col. Leonard Hollyday, by Gustavus Hesselius, c. 1740. Oil on canvas. 27 55/64 × 23 7/64 in. (70.8 × 58.7 cm). Maryland Historical Society, Accession: 1960-88-1

References

Other sources
Fleischer, Roland E (1987) Gustavus Hesselius: Face Painter to the Middle Colonies (Trenton: New Jersey State Museum) 

Related reading

 Richard H. Saunders and Ellen G. Miles  (1987) American Colonial Portraits, 1700–1776 (Washington, D.C.: National Portrait Gallery, Smithsonian Institution) 
Pleasants, J. Hall (1945) Two Hundred and Fifty Years of Painting in Maryland (Baltimore, Maryland: Baltimore Museum of Art)
Lindsey, Jack L., Worldly Goods, The Arts of Early Pennsylvania, 1680–1758 (Philadelphia, PA: Philadelphia Museum of Art, 1999) 
Benson, Adolph B. and Naboth Hedin (1938) Swedes in America, 1638-1938'' (Yale University Press)

External links
 "Hesselius Family Papers, 1780-1820s", The Frick Collection/Frick Art Reference Library Archives.
Gustavus Hesselius Smithsonian American Art Museum
 

1682 births
1755 deaths
People from Dalarna County
Swedish emigrants to the United States
18th-century Swedish painters
18th-century Swedish male artists
Swedish male painters
People from Prince George's County, Maryland
18th-century American painters
18th-century American male artists
American male painters
Artists from Philadelphia
Painters from Maryland
Painters from Pennsylvania
American pipe organ builders